New Zealand has 1157 described spider species, with an estimated total fauna of 2000 species. Over 97 per cent are endemic, and the rest have been introduced through human activities or were natural wind-borne introductions.

The Australian white-tailed spider, first recorded in New Zealand in 1886, has been falsely attributed as the cause of many necrotising spider bites.

The flat huntsman spider (Delena cancerides), also from Australia, and called the Avondale spider in New Zealand, was accidentally introduced in the early 1920s, possibly in shipments of hardwood logs used for railway sleepers. The huntsman spiders, which are considered harmless to humans, have been collected for use in at least two films.

Very few New Zealand spiders have bites that can cause significant injury to humans, and of these, only one – the katipō – is endemic. Katipō bites have been known to cause systemic effects, such as hypertension, seizure, or coma, though no deaths as a result of katipō bites have been recorded for over 200 years. Its more dangerous close relative, the venomous Australian redback spider, has established a foothold in some parts of New Zealand, notably in Taranaki and Central Otago.

Fishing spiders

There are four spiders in the genus Dolomedes (the fishing spiders), species which have adapted to hunt on the surface of water.

Three of the fishing spiders are widespread on the two main islands of New Zealand. Another species of similar size, Dolomedes dondalei, specialises in forested riverbanks and is also widespread on the mainland. The third and most common species, Dolomedes minor, is not restricted to rivers. Known as the nursery web spider, it makes white nursery webs on shrubs, but is still capable of fishing behaviour. The largest of the New Zealand fishing spiders is Dolomedes schauinslandi and occurs on South East and Mangere islands in the Chatham Islands.

Species
Spider species in New Zealand include:
 Anoteropsis (wolf spiders)
 Celaenia spp
 Cambridgea spp. (sheetweb spider)
 Cryptachaea veruculata
 Delena cancerides (Avondale spider)
 Dolomedes aquaticus
 Dolomedes dondalei
 Dolomedes minor
 Gradungula
 Gradungulidae
 Haurokoa
 Hexathele hochstetteri
 Lamponidae
 Latrodectus katipo (katipō)
 Paradictyna spp
 Paradictyna rufoflava
 Pholcus phalangioides
 Poecilopachys australasia (two-spined spider)
 Porrhothele antipodiana
 Spelungula cavernicola (Nelson cave spider)
 Steatoda capensis
 Trite parvula
 Trite planiceps
 Uliodon spp (vagrant spiders)

See also
Fauna of New Zealand

References

External links

Spiders of New Zealand at Museum of New Zealand Te Papa Tongarewa
 Nursery Web Spiders from Museum of New Zealand Te Papa Tongarewa Website, July 2008
Greenwood, Michelle, 2008. Aquatic Assassins: The Secret Life of Fishing Spiders. New Zealand Geographic, 91. (online summary)